Piya Ka Ghar ( My beloved's house) is a 1972 Indian Hindi-language comedy set in Mumbai in the 1970s. It is a remake of Raja Thakur's Marathi film Mumbaicha Jawai. It portrays the difficulties of life in India's biggest city during the 1970s in the form of a comic family drama. Its song "Ye Jeevan Hai" sung by Kishore Kumar was frequently used in 2022 movie Uunchai in background as a part of the story plot.

Plot
The two main characters are Ram and Malti (Jaya Bhaduri). Ram lives in a chawl (tenement) in Mumbai. Malti initially lives in a relatively comfortable home in an unidentified village.

Ram and Malti are hooked up through a matchmaker that their parents have hired. We first see the matchmaker visiting Malti's house; he then visits Ram and his family (parents, two brothers, one sister-in-law, three uncles, and two aunts), who live together in a one-room apartment.

Ram and Malti fall in love, and Ram's family visits her in her village. Soon, they are married, and Malti moves to Ram's apartment, not knowing what to expect. Since there is very little room left in the apartment, the newlyweds are forced to sleep in the kitchen. They make several comical, but failed, attempts to have some privacy.

At last, Malti can bear it no longer, and her uncle arrives to take her back to the village. But when they see all her in-laws offering to move out on her account, they change their minds, saying that such love overcomes the difficulties of living in Mumbai. In the end, the couple finally finds the privacy they were seeking.

Cast

Soundtrack
The following songs, listed in the order in which they appear.  Lyrics are penned by Anand Bakshi and Music is composed by Laxmikant Pyarelal

 "Ye Zulf Kaisee Hai" by Mohammed Rafi and Lata Mangeshkar
 "Ye Jeevan Hai" by Kishore Kumar
 "Piya Ka Ghar" by Lata Mangeshkar
 "Bambaee Shahar Kee" by Kishore Kumar

References

External links
 
 MusicIndiaOnline page- includes first three songs and lyrics to "Ye Jeevan Hai"
 Piya Ka Ghar

1972 films
1970s Hindi-language films
Films directed by Basu Chatterjee
Indian comedy films
Films scored by Laxmikant–Pyarelal
Rajshri Productions films
Films set in Mumbai
Films shot in Mumbai
1972 comedy films
Hindi-language comedy films